Mary Ann McMorrow (née Grohwin; January 16, 1930 – February 23, 2013) was an Illinois Supreme Court chief justice.

Career
Mary Ann Grohwin was born to Roman and Emily Grohwin and grew up in a Roman Catholic household on the northwest side of Chicago. She attended Rosary College, now known as Dominican University.  She received her law degree at Loyola University Chicago School of Law and was admitted practice law in Illinois in 1953.

She was employed by the law firm of Riordan & Linklater. She was appointed Assistant State's Attorney of Cook County, assigned to the Criminal Division, and was the first woman to prosecute felony  cases in Cook County. She was elected a Judge of the Circuit Court of Cook County in 1976. By order of the Supreme Court of Illinois, McMorrow was assigned to the Illinois Appellate Court in 1985 and elected to that court in 1986. She was the first woman elected to serve as chairperson of the Executive Committee of the Appellate Court. She was elected to the Supreme Court of Illinois in 1992, the first woman to serve in its 173-year history. With her election as Chief Justice of the Supreme Court of Illinois in May 2002, she became the first woman to head any of the three branches of state government.

Awards
She was the 1991 recipient of the "Medal of Excellence" award from Loyola University Chicago School of Law's Alumni Association. She also was awarded the Chicago Bar Association's Justice John Paul Stevens Award and the 1996 The Fellows of the Illinois Bar Foundation award for Distinguished Service to Law and Society.

Mary Ann McMorrow was inducted as a Laureate of The Lincoln Academy of Illinois and awarded the Order of Lincoln (the State’s highest honor) by the Governor of Illinois in 2007 in the area of Government and Law.

Retirement
Justice McMorrow retired from the bench on July 5, 2006.

Association memberships
Chief Justice McMorrow was a member of the:

 Illinois State Bar Association and Chicago Bar Associations
 Women's Bar Association of Illinois
 American Inns of Court (Master Bencher)
 American Judicature Society
 National Association of Women Judges
 Illinois Judges' Association (Board of Directors)

Death
Justice McMorrow died on February 23, 2013, at Northwestern Memorial Hospital in Chicago, aged 83, from undisclosed causes. She was married to Emmett McMorrow; the couple had one child, a daughter, Mary Ann (born 1963).

See also
List of female state supreme court justices

References

External links
 Mary Ann McMorrow's  biodata at the Illinois Supreme Court website

1930 births
2013 deaths
American Roman Catholics 
Lawyers from Chicago
Loyola University Chicago School of Law alumni
Women in Illinois politics
Judges of the Illinois Appellate Court
Chief Justices of the Illinois Supreme Court
Women chief justices of state supreme courts in the United States
Justices of the Illinois Supreme Court
Judges of the Circuit Court of Cook County
20th-century American judges
20th-century American lawyers
20th-century American women judges
21st-century American women
21st-century American women judges
21st-century American judges